The 2015–16 season was Leeds United's sixth consecutive season in the Championship. Along with competing in the Championship, the club also participated in the FA Cup and League Cup. The season covered the period from 1 July 2015 to 30 June 2016.

Review
With Neil Redfearn having been sacked as manager in the summer, owner Massimo Cellino turned to Uwe Rösler, who had experienced some success with Brentford, but had been sacked as manager of then-Championship rivals Wigan Athletic in the middle of an ultimately unsuccessful relegation struggle the previous season. The summer also saw few signings of note being made, and a host of departures, including Billy Sharp, who had heavily underwhelmed by scoring just five goals in the previous season, and dropped down a division to return to former club Sheffield United.

As had become increasingly typical in recent years, Rösler had precious little time in charge of Leeds, and was sacked after winning just two of his first ten league matches (albeit five of them had ended in draws). He was replaced by Steve Evans, who had recently been sacked by Yorkshire rivals Rotherham United, and while the club's form initially remained unimpressive, results did eventually pick up. However, Leeds were too inconsistent to produce anything better than a season of mid-table mediocrity, with the only saving grace being that even this was better than most of their recent seasons. Among the few positives of the campaign were the form of newly-recruited New Zealander Chris Wood, who would prove Leeds' top scorer this year. Additionally, the relative lack of new signings and an injury crisis forced Evans to fall back on several youngsters, including Kalvin Phillips, who would become key figures in the side in the years ahead. Evans would not last long enough to see the fruits of this, however, as for the third season in succession, Leeds sacked their manager after the season ended.

Events

This is a list of the significant events to occur at the club during the 2014–15 season, presented in chronological order, starting on 2 May 2015 and ending on the final day of the club's final match in the 2015–16 season. This list does not include transfers or new contracts, which are listed in the transfers section below, or match results, which are in the results section.

May
7 May: Massimo Cellino has been granted Football League permission to return to the club's board, taking up the role as Leeds United chairman with immediate effect after passing the League's Owners and Directors Test.
11 May: Adam Pearson returns to the club as executive director, to assist Massimo Cellino.
12 May: The Financial Fair Play transfer embargo imposed upon the club in December is lifted for the 2015 summer transfer window, with no club now under no restrictions in relation to buying or selling players.
20 May: Uwe Rösler is named as the club's new head coach on a two-year deal.

June
3 June: Rob Kelly is named assistant head coach, penning a two-year deal.
9 June: Richard Hartis becomes the club's new goalkeeping coach. As a result of this move, Neil Sullivan returned to his previous role the Academy, coaching the Under-21s and U18s.
15 June: Martyn Glover joins the club from West Ham United as the new head of recruitment. The club also confirmed that Stuart Hayton had joined the previous week from Liverpool as the new club secretary.
16 June: The club announce a five-year deal with Italian sportswear giants Kappa to become the club's new kit provider from the 2015/16 season onwards.
24 June: The club reach a mutual agreement with Nicola Salerno for him to depart from his role as Sporting Director.

July
2 July: Julian Darby joins the backroom staff as a first-team coach.
13 July: Leeds re-purchase the catering and beverage rights for Elland Road and the Centenary Pavilion, ending a period where it had been outsourced after being sold in June 2012.
13 July: Global Autocare are announced as the club's official South Stand Sponsor and Vehicle Partner for the next three years in a record-breaking partnership.
16 July: Neil Redfearn resigns from academy position, claiming the club made his position "untenable".

August
4 August: Sol Bamba is named as the club's captain for the 2015/16 season.
21 August: The club announce a partnership with bookmakers CORAL, who will become the club's official betting and gaming partner, as well as sponsoring the North East Corner Stand of Elland Road.

September
4 September: Paul Hart returns as the club's new Head of Academy.
15 September: Adam Pearson departs from his role as executive director.

October
19 October: Uwe Rösler and the club part ways, with Rösler departing from his position as head coach. Assistant manager Rob Kelly and first-team coach Julian Darby have been placed on gardening leave.  Steve Evans is appointed as head coach, on a rolling contract until 30 June 2016, with Paul Raynor joining as assistant coach.

First team squad 

Appearances (starts and substitute appearances) and goals include those in the Championship (and playoffs), League One (and playoffs), FA Cup, League Cup and Football League Trophy.

Transfers

In

Loans in

Loans out

Transfers out

New contracts

Pre-season
Leeds confirmed pre-season fixtures against Athletic Bilbao and Hoffenheim on 28 May 2015. The game originally scheduled against Athletic Bilbao was changed to Eintracht Frankfurt, due to the Spanish side's commitments in the Europa League qualifiers. The club confirmed games against local sides Harrogate Town and York City on 12 June 2015. On 22 June, the final game of Leeds' pre season was added, with Everton visiting Elland Road.

Competitions

Overall summary

Championship

League table

Results summary

Results by matchday

Matches
On 17 June 2015, the fixtures for the forthcoming season were announced.

FA Cup
Leeds drew Rotherham United at home in the third round of the FA Cup. Leeds drew the winners of Eastleigh vs. Bolton Wanderers in the fourth round. Leeds drew an away game against Watford in the fifth round.

League Cup

Leeds were drawn away to Doncaster Rovers in the first round, on 16 June 2015.

Squad statistics

Appearances and goals

|-
|colspan="14"|Players currently out on loan:

|-
|colspan="17"|Players who have been available for selection this season, but have now permanently left the club:

Source: Sky Sports

Top scorers

Byram joined West Ham United on 20 January 2016.

Disciplinary record
Last Updated: 23 April 2016

1Byram joined West Ham United on 20 January 2016.
2Carayol picked up two yellows during his previous loan spell at Huddersfield Town, before joining Leeds.
3Diagouraga picked up six yellows at Brentford, before joining Leeds.

Suspensions served
As of 12 April 2016

Captains

Awards

Internal Awards

Official Player of the Year Awards

The results of the 2015–16 Leeds United F.C. Player of the Year Awards were announced at a dinner on 30 April 2016 at Elland Road.

Fans' Player of the Year:  Charlie Taylor
Young Player of the Year: Lewis Cook
Players' Player of the Year: Stuart Dallas
Goal of the Season: Lewis Cook (vs Fulham, 23 February 2016)

References

Leeds United
Leeds United F.C. seasons
Foot